Oreitans/Oritans and Oreitians/Oritians were the ancient inhabitants of modern Lasbela District in Balochistan province of Pakistan. 

Alexander the Great crossed Hub River through Lasbela on his way back to Babylon after conquering Northwestern India. Alexander mentions the river name as Arabius, and local people as Oreitans. The largest town of them was called Rhambacia (Ῥαμβακία). One more town which is mentioned by name was the Ora (Ὤροις).

After Alexander conquered them, he placed Apollophanes as Satrap in the area.
Alexander told Hephaestion to built a city in Rhambacia and to Apollophanes to built a city in Ora.

After Alexander left, at some point Oreitans rebelled. Leonnatus manage to defeat them killing 6,000 and all their leaders, while losing only 15 cavalrymen and a handful of men, but Apollophanes (the Satrap) killed in the battle.

See also
 Arabius
 Rhambacia

References

Social groups of Pakistan
Ancient peoples of Pakistan
History of Pakistan
Lasbela District
Wars of Alexander the Great